The 2021–22  PGA Tour was the 107th season of the PGA Tour, and the 55th since separating from the PGA of America. The season began on September 16, 2021. The 2022 FedEx Cup Playoffs began on August 11, and concluded on August 28, 2022.

Changes for 2021–22

Prize fund
The Tour announced more than $100 million in purse increases for the 2021–22 season including:
 Increasing the FedEx Cup bonus pool (from $60 million to $75 million)
 Doubling the regular season bonus pool, known as the Comcast Business Tour Top 10 (from $10 million to $20 million) 
 Increasing the Player Impact Program, which rewards players that drive fan engagement (from $40 million to $50 million)
 Introducing the Play15 Bonus program, which rewards every player who makes at least 15 starts with $50,000
 Significant increases in the purses of limited-field events including increasing the Players Championship purse to $20 million

Response to LIV Golf
Preceding the first event of the LIV Golf Invitational Series in London, the PGA Tour announced on June 1, 2022, that they would sanction players who competed in the event. Seventeen PGA Tour members played in the event, including major champions Phil Mickelson, Dustin Johnson, Sergio García, Martin Kaymer, Louis Oosthuizen, Charl Schwartzel and Graeme McDowell, and former world number one Lee Westwood. Nine of the players resigned from the tour. On June 9, the tour announced that all members participating in the first LIV tournament, including those who had resigned, were no longer eligible to compete in tour events or the Presidents Cup.

Seven more PGA Tour members joined LIV Golf for the series' second event in Portland, Oregon, including major champions Brooks Koepka, Bryson DeChambeau, and Patrick Reed (who resigned from the tour). The PGA Tour confirmed their suspensions shortly following the start of that event.

In late July, the tour created a FedExCup Playoffs Eligibility ranking list which did not include the suspended players. Ten players who finished inside the top-125 of the standard FedExCup Standings were excluded; they were Talor Gooch, Jason Kokrak, Matt Jones, Hudson Swafford, Matthew Wolff, Abraham Ancer, Carlos Ortiz, Brooks Koepka, Charles Howell III, and Pat Perez. Three of these (Gooch, Jones and Swafford) failed in their attempt to gain a temporary restraining order to allow them to compete in the playoffs.

Schedule
The following table lists official events during the 2021–22 season.

Unofficial events
The following events were sanctioned by the PGA Tour, but did not carry FedEx Cup points or official money, nor were wins official.

Location of tournaments

FedEx Cup

Points distribution

The distribution of points for 2021–22 PGA Tour events is as follows:

Tour Championship starting score (to par), based on position in the FedEx Cup rankings after the BMW Championship:

FedEx Cup standings
For full rankings, see 2022 FedEx Cup Playoffs.

Top 31 in the final FedEx Cup standings following the Tour Championship:

• Did not play

Awards

See also
2021 in golf

2021 European Tour
2022 European Tour
2022 Korn Ferry Tour
2022 PGA Tour Champions season

Notes

References

External links 
Official site

2022
2021 in golf
2022 in golf